Francesco II da Carrara (19 May 1359 – 16 January 1406), known as Francesco il Novello ('Francesco the Younger'), was Lord of Padua after his father, Francesco I il Vecchio, renounced the lordship on 29 June 1388; he was a member of the family of Carraresi.  He married Taddea, daughter of Niccolò II d'Este, Lord of Modena.

He fought in the Battle of Castagnaro (1387) for Padua.

He was executed by Venetian officials after his capture during the war between Venice and Padua (see War of Padua). Burckhardt writes: "when the last Carrara could no longer defend the walls and gates of the plague-stricken Padua, hemmed in on all sides by the Venetians, the soldiers of the guard heard him cry to the devil 'to come and kill him.'" His sons Francesco and Giacomo who had also been captured were executed the following day. 
In Francesco's extensive familia, or ducal household, the painter Cennino Cennini imbibed the humanist culture expressed in his celebrated Libro dell'arte.

Family
Francesco II had several legitimate children:
 Francesco III, was strangled a few days after his father.
 Jacopo, taken prisoner after the surrender of Verona, strangled a few days after his father.
 Ubertino
 Marsilio
 Nicolò, died in childhood
 Gigliola da Carrara
 Valpurga, abbess of Saint Agatha in Padua

He also had a number of illegitimate offspring:
 Stefano
 Gionata
 Milone
 Agnese, married Ognibene da Mantova

References

Sources
 

1359 births
1406 deaths
Lords of Padua
15th-century condottieri
14th-century condottieri
People executed by the Republic of Venice
People executed by strangulation
Da Carrara family